Sepietta petersi, also known as the mysterious bobtail, is a species of bobtail squid native to the Mediterranean Sea. A doubtful record of S. petersi also exists from the Atlantic Ocean off Morocco.

The type specimen was collected in the Adriatic Sea and is deposited at the Zoologiska Museet in Uppsala, Sweden.

S. petersi has been described as a doubtful species and was considered a senior synonym of Sepietta obscura by Kir Nesis. A redescription of S. petersi and S. obscura is needed to determine the status of these two taxa. Other authorities consider it to be a synonym of Sepietta oweniana.

References

External links

Bobtail squid
Molluscs of the Atlantic Ocean
Molluscs of the Mediterranean Sea
Marine molluscs of Africa
Marine molluscs of Europe